Arbanitis watsonorum is a species of armoured trap-door spider in the family Idiopidae, and is endemic to New South Wales.

It was first described by Wishart and Rowell in 2008 as Misgolas watsonorum, but was transferred to the genus, Arbanitis, by Michael Rix and others in 2017. The species epithet, watsonorum, honours Ken and Sue Watson.

Description 
The carapace of the male holotype is 6.75 mm long by 5.15 mm wide, with an abdomen 7.74 mm by 4.55 mm. The female paratype  has a carapace which is 12.85 mm by 9.33 mm and an abdomen 18.82 mm by 11.76 mm.

References 

Idiopidae
Spiders of Australia